Kim Mu-hyeon (born 16 June 1941) is a South Korean basketball player. He competed in the men's tournament at the 1964 Summer Olympics and the 1968 Summer Olympics.

References

1941 births
Living people
South Korean men's basketball players
Olympic basketball players of South Korea
Basketball players at the 1964 Summer Olympics
Basketball players at the 1968 Summer Olympics
Basketball players from Seoul
Asian Games medalists in basketball
Asian Games bronze medalists for South Korea
Basketball players at the 1966 Asian Games
Medalists at the 1966 Asian Games